Cosmosoma vesparia is a moth of the subfamily Arctiinae. It was described by Maximilian Perty in 1834. It is found in the Amazon region.

References

vesparia
Moths described in 1834
Taxa named by Maximilian Perty